The Anglican Communion is the third largest Christian communion after the Roman Catholic and Eastern Orthodox churches. Founded in 1867 in London, the communion has more than 85 million members within the Church of England and other autocephalous national and regional churches in full communion. The traditional origins of Anglican doctrine are summarised in the Thirty-nine Articles (1571). Most, but not all, member churches of the communion are the historic national or regional Anglican churches.

The Anglican Communion was officially and formally organised and recognised as such at the Lambeth Conference in 1867 in London under the leadership of Charles Longley, Archbishop of Canterbury. The churches of the Anglican Communion consider themselves to be part of the one, holy, catholic and apostolic church, and to be both Catholic and Reformed. As in the Church of England itself, the Anglican Communion includes the broad spectrum of beliefs and liturgical practises found in the Evangelical, Central and Anglo-Catholic traditions of Anglicanism. Each national or regional church is fully independent, retaining its own legislative process and episcopal polity under the leadership of local primates. For some adherents, Anglicanism represents a non-papal Catholicism, for others a form of Protestantism though without a guiding figure such as Martin Luther, John Knox, John Calvin, Huldrych Zwingli, John Wesley or Jan Hus,  or, for yet others, a combination of the two.

Most of its members live in the Anglosphere of former British territories. Full participation in the sacramental life of each church is available to all communicant members. Because of their historical link to England (ecclesia anglicana means "English church"), some of the member churches are known as "Anglican", such as the Anglican Church of Canada. Others, for example the Church of Ireland and the Scottish and American Episcopal churches, have official names that do not include "Anglican". Additionally, some churches that do use the name "Anglican" are not part of the communion. These have generally disaffiliated over disagreement with the direction of the communion. On February 20, 2023, ten communion provinces and Anglican realignment churches within Global South Fellowship of Anglican Churches released a statement stating that they had declared "impaired communion" with the Church of England and no longer recognised Justin Welby as "first among equals" among the bishops of the communion, de facto marking a schism within the Anglican Communion.

History

The Anglican Communion traces much of its growth to the older mission organisations of the Church of England such as the Society for Promoting Christian Knowledge (founded 1698), the Society for the Propagation of the Gospel in Foreign Parts (founded 1701) and the Church Missionary Society (founded 1799). The Church of England (which until the 20th century included the Church in Wales) initially separated from the Roman Catholic Church in 1534 in the reign of Henry VIII, reunited in 1555 under Mary I and then separated again in 1570 under Elizabeth I (the Roman Catholic Church excommunicated Elizabeth I in 1570 in response to the Act of Supremacy 1559).

The Church of England has always thought of itself not as a new foundation but rather as a reformed continuation of the ancient "English Church" (Ecclesia Anglicana) and a reassertion of that church's rights. As such it was a distinctly national phenomenon. The Church of Scotland was formed as a separate church from the Roman Catholic Church as a result of the Scottish Reformation in 1560 and the later formation of the Scottish Episcopal Church began in 1582 in the reign of James VI over disagreements about the role of bishops.

The oldest-surviving Anglican church building outside the British Isles (Britain and Ireland) is St Peter's Church in St. George's, Bermuda, established in 1612 (though the actual building had to be rebuilt several times over the following century). This is also the oldest surviving non-Roman Catholic church in the New World. It remained part of the Church of England until 1978 when the Anglican Church of Bermuda separated. The Church of England was the established church not only in England, but in its trans-Oceanic colonies.

Thus the only member churches of the present Anglican Communion existing by the mid-18th century were the Church of England, its closely linked sister church the Church of Ireland (which also separated from Roman Catholicism under Henry VIII) and the Scottish Episcopal Church which for parts of the 17th and 18th centuries was partially underground (it was suspected of Jacobite sympathies).

Global spread of Anglicanism

The enormous expansion in the 18th and 19th centuries of the British Empire brought Anglicanism along with it. At first all these colonial churches were under the jurisdiction of the bishop of London. After the American Revolution, the parishes in the newly independent country found it necessary to break formally from a church whose supreme governor was (and remains) the British monarch. Thus they formed their own dioceses and national church, the Episcopal Church in the United States of America, in a mostly amicable separation.

At about the same time, in the colonies which remained linked to the crown, the Church of England began to appoint colonial bishops. In 1787, a bishop of Nova Scotia was appointed with a jurisdiction over all of British North America; in time several more colleagues were appointed to other cities in present-day Canada. In 1814, a bishop of Calcutta was made; in 1824 the first bishop was sent to the West Indies and in 1836 to Australia. By 1840 there were still only ten colonial bishops for the Church of England; but even this small beginning greatly facilitated the growth of Anglicanism around the world. In 1841, a "Colonial Bishoprics Council" was set up and soon many more dioceses were created.

In time, it became natural to group these into provinces and a metropolitan bishop was appointed for each province. Although it had at first been somewhat established in many colonies, in 1861 it was ruled that, except where specifically established, the Church of England had just the same legal position as any other church. Thus a colonial bishop and colonial diocese was by nature quite a different thing from their counterparts back home. In time bishops came to be appointed locally rather than from England and eventually national synods began to pass ecclesiastical legislation independent of England.

A crucial step in the development of the modern communion was the idea of the Lambeth Conferences (discussed above). These conferences demonstrated that the bishops of disparate churches could manifest the unity of the church in their episcopal collegiality despite the absence of universal legal ties. Some bishops were initially reluctant to attend, fearing that the meeting would declare itself a council with power to legislate for the church; but it agreed to pass only advisory resolutions. These Lambeth Conferences have been held roughly every ten years since 1878 (the second such conference) and remain the most visible coming-together of the whole communion.

The Lambeth Conference of 1998 included what has been seen by Philip Jenkins and others as a "watershed in global Christianity". The 1998 Lambeth Conference considered the issue of the theology of same-sex attraction in relation to human sexuality. At this 1998 conference for the first time in centuries the Christians of developing regions, especially, Africa, Asia, and Latin America, prevailed over the bishops of more prosperous countries (many from the US, Canada, and the UK) who supported a redefinition of Anglican doctrine. Seen in this light 1998 is a date that marked the shift from a West-dominated Christianity to one wherein the growing churches of the two-thirds world are predominant.

Controversies

One effect of the Anglican Communion's dispersed authority has been the conflicts arising over divergent practices and doctrines in parts of the communion. Disputes that had been confined to the Church of England could be dealt with legislatively in that realm, but as the Communion spread out into new nations and disparate cultures, such controversies multiplied and intensified. These controversies have generally been of two types: liturgical and social.

Anglo-Catholicism
The first such controversy of note concerned that of the growing influence of the Catholic Revival manifested in the Tractarian and so-called Ritualist controversies of the late nineteenth and early twentieth centuries. This controversy produced the Free Church of England and, in the United States and Canada, the Reformed Episcopal Church.

Social changes
Later, rapid social change and the dissipation of British cultural hegemony over its former colonies contributed to disputes over the role of women, the parameters of marriage and divorce, and the practices of contraception and abortion. In the late 1970s, the Continuing Anglican movement produced a number of new church bodies in opposition to women's ordination, prayer book changes, and the new understandings concerning marriage.

Same-sex unions and LGBT clergy
More recently, disagreements over homosexuality have strained the unity of the communion as well as its relationships with other Christian denominations, leading to another round of withdrawals from the Anglican Communion. Some churches were founded outside the Anglican Communion in the late 20th and early 21st centuries, largely in opposition to the ordination of openly homosexual bishops and other clergy and are usually referred to as belonging to the Anglican realignment movement, or else as "orthodox" Anglicans. These disagreements were especially noted when the Episcopal Church (US) consecrated an openly gay bishop in a same-sex relationship, Gene Robinson, in 2003, which led some Episcopalians to defect and found the Anglican Church in North America (ACNA); then, the debate reignited when the Church of England agreed to allow clergy to enter into same-sex civil partnerships, as long as they remained celibate, in 2005. The Church of Nigeria opposed the Episcopal Church's decision as well as the Church of England's approval for celibate civil partnerships.

"The more liberal provinces that are open to changing Church doctrine on marriage in order to allow for same-sex unions include Brazil, Canada, New Zealand, Scotland, South India, South Africa, the US and Wales". In 2023, the Church of England announced that it will authorise "prayers of thanksgiving, dedication and for God's blessing for same-sex couples". The Church of England also permits clergy to enter into same-sex civil partnerships. The Church of Ireland has no official position on civil unions, and one senior cleric has entered into a same-sex civil partnership. The Church of Ireland recognised that it will "treat civil partners the same as spouses". The Anglican Church of Australia does not have an official position on homosexuality.

The conservative Anglican churches encouraging the realignment movement are more concentrated in the Global South. For example, the Anglican Church of Kenya, the Church of Nigeria and the Church of Uganda have opposed homosexuality. GAFCON, a fellowship of conservative Anglican churches, has appointed "missionary bishops" in response to the disagreements with the perceived liberalisation in the Anglican churches in North America and Europe. In 2023, ten archbishops within the Anglican Communion and two breakaway churches in North America and Brazil from the Global South Fellowship of Anglican Churches (GSFA) declared a state of impaired communion with the Church of England and announced that they would no longer recognise the archbishop of Canterbury as the "first among equals" among the bishops in the Anglican Communion. However, in the same statement, the ten archbishops said that they would not leave the Anglican Communion.

Debates about social theology and ethics have occurred at the same time as debates on prayer book revision and the acceptable grounds for achieving full communion with non-Anglican churches.

Ecclesiology, polity and ethos

The Anglican Communion has no official legal existence nor any governing structure that might exercise authority over the member churches. There is an Anglican Communion Office in London, under the aegis of the archbishop of Canterbury, but it serves only in a supporting and organisational role. The communion is held together by a shared history, expressed in its ecclesiology, polity and ethos, and also by participation in international consultative bodies.

Three elements have been important in holding the communion together: first, the shared ecclesial structure of the component churches, manifested in an episcopal polity maintained through the apostolic succession of bishops and synodical government; second, the principle of belief expressed in worship, investing importance in approved prayer books and their rubrics; and third, the historical documents and the writings of early Anglican divines that have influenced the ethos of the communion.

Originally, the Church of England was self-contained and relied for its unity and identity on its own history, its traditional legal and episcopal structure, and its status as an established church of the state. As such, Anglicanism was from the outset a movement with an explicitly episcopal polity, a characteristic that has been vital in maintaining the unity of the communion by conveying the episcopate's role in manifesting visible catholicity and ecumenism.

Early in its development following the English Reformation, Anglicanism developed a vernacular prayer book, called the Book of Common Prayer. Unlike other traditions, Anglicanism has never been governed by a magisterium nor by appeal to one founding theologian, nor by an extra-credal summary of doctrine (such as the Westminster Confession of the Presbyterian churches). Instead, Anglicans have typically appealed to the Book of Common Prayer (1662) and its offshoots as a guide to Anglican theology and practise.

Protracted conflict through the 17th century, with radical Protestants on the one hand and Roman Catholics who recognised the primacy of the Pope on the other, resulted in an association of churches that was both deliberately vague about doctrinal principles, yet bold in developing parameters of acceptable deviation. These parameters were most clearly articulated in the various rubrics of the successive prayer books, as well as the Thirty-nine Articles of Religion (1563). These articles have historically shaped and continue to direct the ethos of the communion, an ethos reinforced by its interpretation and expansion by such influential early theologians such as Richard Hooker, Lancelot Andrewes and John Cosin.

With the expansion of the British Empire and the growth of Anglicanism outside Great Britain and Ireland, the communion sought to establish new vehicles of unity. The first major expressions of this were the Lambeth Conferences of the communion's bishops, first convened in 1867 by Charles Longley, the archbishop of Canterbury. From the beginning, these were not intended to displace the autonomy of the emerging provinces of the communion, but to "discuss matters of practical interest, and pronounce what we deem expedient in resolutions which may serve as safe guides to future action".

Chicago Lambeth Quadrilateral 
One of the enduringly influential early resolutions of the conference was the so-called Chicago-Lambeth Quadrilateral of 1888. Its intent was to provide the basis for discussions of reunion with the Roman Catholic and Orthodox churches, but it had the ancillary effect of establishing parameters of Anglican identity. It establishes four principles with these words:

Instruments of communion 
As mentioned above, the Anglican Communion has no international juridical organisation. The archbishop of Canterbury's role is strictly symbolic and unifying and the communion's three international bodies are consultative and collaborative, their resolutions having no legal effect on the autonomous provinces of the communion. Taken together, however, the four do function as "instruments of communion", since all churches of the communion participate in them. In order of antiquity, they are:

 The archbishop of Canterbury functions as the spiritual head of the communion. The archbishop is the focus of unity, since no church claims membership in the communion without being in communion with him. The present archbishop is Justin Welby.
 The Lambeth Conference (first held in 1867) is the oldest international consultation. It is a forum for bishops of the communion to reinforce unity and collegiality through manifesting the episcopate, to discuss matters of mutual concern, and to pass resolutions intended to act as guideposts. It is held roughly every ten years and invitation is by the archbishop of Canterbury.
 The Anglican Consultative Council (first met in 1971) was created by a 1968 Lambeth Conference resolution, and meets usually at three-yearly intervals. The council consists of representative bishops, other clergy and laity chosen by the 38 provinces. The body has a permanent secretariat, the Anglican Communion Office, of which the archbishop of Canterbury is president.
 The Primates' Meeting (first met in 1979) is the most recent manifestation of international consultation and deliberation, having been first convened by Archbishop Donald Coggan as a forum for "leisurely thought, prayer and deep consultation".

Since there is no binding authority in the Anglican Communion, these international bodies are a vehicle for consultation and persuasion. In recent times, persuasion has tipped over into debates over conformity in certain areas of doctrine, discipline, worship and ethics. The most notable example has been the objection of many provinces of the communion (particularly in Africa and Asia) to the changing acceptance of LGBTQ+ individuals in the North American churches (e.g., by blessing same-sex unions and ordaining and consecrating same-sex relationships) and to the process by which changes were undertaken. (See Anglican realignment)

Those who objected condemned these actions as unscriptural, unilateral, and without the agreement of the communion prior to these steps being taken. In response, the American Episcopal Church and the Anglican Church of Canada answered that the actions had been undertaken after lengthy scriptural and theological reflection, legally in accordance with their own canons and constitutions and after extensive consultation with the provinces of the communion.

The Primates' Meeting voted to request the two churches to withdraw their delegates from the 2005 meeting of the Anglican Consultative Council. Canada and the United States decided to attend the meeting but without exercising their right to vote. They have not been expelled or suspended, since there is no mechanism in this voluntary association to suspend or expel an independent province of the communion. Since membership is based on a province's communion with Canterbury, expulsion would require the archbishop of Canterbury's refusal to be in communion with the affected jurisdictions. In line with the suggestion of the Windsor Report, Rowan Williams (the then archbishop of Canterbury) established a working group to examine the feasibility of an Anglican covenant which would articulate the conditions for communion in some fashion.

Organisation

Provinces

The Anglican Communion consists of forty-two autonomous provinces each with its own primate and governing structure. These provinces may take the form of national churches (such as in Canada, Uganda, or Japan) or a collection of nations (such as the West Indies, Central Africa, or Southeast Asia).

Extraprovincial churches

In addition to the forty-two provinces, there are five extraprovincial churches under the metropolitical authority of the archbishop of Canterbury.

Former provinces

New provinces in formation
At its Autumn 2020 meeting, the provincial standing committee of the Church of Southern Africa approved a plan to form the dioceses in Mozambique and Angola into a separate autonomous province of the Anglican Communion, to be named the Anglican Church of Mozambique and Angola  (IAMA). The plans were also outlined to the Mozambique and Angola Anglican Association (MANNA) at its September 2020 annual general meeting. The new province is Portuguese-speaking, and consists of twelve dioceses (four in Angola, and eight in Mozambique). The twelve proposed new dioceses have been defined and named, and each has a "Task Force Committee" working towards its establishment as a diocese. The plan received the consent of the bishops and diocesan synods of all four existing dioceses in the two nations, and was submitted to the Anglican Consultative Council.

In September 2020, the Archbishop of Canterbury announced that he had asked the bishops of the Church of Ceylon to begin planning for the formation of an autonomous province of Ceylon, so as to end his current position as metropolitan of the two dioceses in that country.

Churches in full communion

In addition to other member churches, the churches of the Anglican Communion are in full communion with the Old Catholic churches of the Union of Utrecht and the Scandinavian Lutheran churches of the Porvoo Communion in Europe, the India-based Malankara Mar Thoma Syrian and Malabar Independent Syrian churches and the Philippine Independent Church, also known as the Aglipayan Church.

Ecumenical relations

Historic episcopate
The churches of the Anglican Communion have traditionally held that ordination in the historic episcopate is a core element in the validity of clerical ordinations. The Roman Catholic Church, however, does not recognise Anglican orders (see Apostolicae curae). Some Eastern Orthodox churches have issued statements to the effect that Anglican orders could be accepted, yet have still reordained former Anglican clergy; other Eastern Orthodox churches have rejected Anglican orders altogether. Orthodox bishop Kallistos Ware explains this apparent discrepancy as follows:

See also

 Acts of Supremacy
 English Reformation
 Dissolution of the Monasteries
 Ritualism in the Church of England
 Apostolicae curae
 Affirming Catholicism
 Anglican ministry
 Anglo-Catholicism
 British Israelism
 Church Society
 Church's Ministry Among Jewish People
 Compass rose
 Evangelical Anglicanism
 Flag of the Anglican Communion
 Liberal Anglo-Catholicism
 List of heroes of the Christian Church in the Anglican Communion
 List of the largest Protestant bodies
 Reform (Anglican)
 Anglican Use

Notes

References

Citations

Sources

Further reading

 Buchanan, Colin. Historical Dictionary of Anglicanism (2nd ed. 2015) excerpt 
 
 
 Hebert, A. G. The Form of the Church. London: Faber and Faber, 1944.
 Wild, John. What is the Anglican Communion?, in series, The Advent Papers. Cincinnati, Ohio: Forward Movement Publications, [196-]. Note.: Expresses the "Anglo-Catholic" viewpoint.

External links
 
 Anglicans Online
 Project Canterbury Anglican historical documents from around the world
 Brief description and history of the Anglican Communion 1997 article from the Anglican Communion Office

 
1867 establishments in England
Religious organizations established in 1867
Religion in the British Empire